Casos de Família (English: Family Affairs) is a Latin talk show produced by Venevisión International for Univision. Since January 26, 2004, Univision has broadcast Casos de Familia weekday mornings at 10am. Prior to July 30, 2012, Judith Grace was the main presenter of the talk show.  For 2015, Fifi Torralbas will replace Tere Marin as host.

This show has a Brazilian version, showed by SBT, and has the same format, though the channel airs the show on early afternoons.

References

External links
 

2004 American television series debuts
2000s American television talk shows
2010s American television talk shows
Univision original programming